The Free Party was a minor political party in the United Kingdom. They were founded to promote the free party scene during the 2001 general election. They stood candidates for the three Parliamentary seats within the city of Brighton and Hove, under names associated with the Church of the SubGenius. They proposed to select their policies from a wheel of fortune.

Bob Dobbs
In the 1997 general election, a candidate stood for election in Brighton, Pavilion, using the description Church of the SubGenius, and the name of the "church" leader, J. R. "Bob" Dobbs. This was the election when the Labour Party was swept into power, winning the election in Brighton and making Tony Blair prime minister. The Labour government introduced the Political Parties, Elections and Referendums Act 2000, legislation requiring the registration of political parties, and at the 2001 election, the Free Party was registered with the Electoral Commission, the registered party symbol chosen being an image of Dobbs' face.

At the 2001 election, the party stood candidates in all the local constituencies, with Bob Dobbs achieving 1 per cent of the total votes for the Pavilion seat, beating the UK Independence Party into seventh place. This was not enough, however, to secure the return of the candidates' £500 deposits.

After the 2001 election, the party failed to submit the required returns of electoral expenses, and the party was deregistered in March 2002.

At the following election, two candidates named Dobbs were again on the ballot, but without the party name their votes dropped dramatically.

Elections contested by Free Party and allies

References

External links
Party website(Archived link)
Urban 75 on Election 2001

Defunct political parties in England
Political parties established in 2001
Political parties disestablished in 2002
2001 establishments in the United Kingdom
2002 disestablishments in the United Kingdom